Vekh Baraatan Challiyan is a 2017 Indian romantic comedy film directed by Ksshitij Chaudhary and written by Naresh Kathooria. Its principal cast includes Binnu Dhillon, Ranjit Bawa, Kavita Kaushik, Jaswinder Bhalla, Karamjit Anmol. The film is produced by Karaj Gill, Amiek Virk & Jaspal Singh Sandhu. It was released worldwide on 28 July 2017.

Plot
It is the story of Jaggi, a Sikh Jat from Punjab, who falls in love with Sarla, a Hindu Jat girl from Haryana, while being a part-time conductor on a bus owned by his father. When Jaggi along with his family pursues Sarla's family to agree for their marriage, a Pandit declares Jaggi to be Manglik and says that the marriage would result in Sarla's death. On being asked whether there is a way Jaggi could marry Sarla, the Pandit tells that Jaggi would first have to marry a black dog. In spite of his family's resistance, Jaggi agrees to find a black dog and marry it, just to clear his way for marrying Sarla. What follows is a roller-coaster of comic events.

Cast
Binnu Dhillon as Jagtar Waraich/Jaggi
Kavita Kaushik as Sarla Dangi
Amrinder Gill as Subeh (Special Appearance)
Karamjit Anmol as Resham (Bus Driver)
Ranjit Bawa as Shindi (Special Appearance)
Jaswinder Bhalla as Karam Singh Waraich (Jaggi's father)
Govind Namdev as Jile Singh Dangi (Sarla's father) 
Anupriya Goenka as Saroj (Special Appearance)
Rupinder Rupi as Gurmeet kaur (Jaggi's mom)
Gurmeet Saajan as Shindi's father (Jaggi’s Chacha)
Mithila Purohit as Omni/Omwati (Sarla's friend)
Parminder Gill as Shindi's mother
Mukesh Bhatt as Pandit

Box office
On its opening day the film grossed 1.20 crore in India, making one of the highest Punjabi film opening of 2017. The film collected 5.70 crore domestically in its first weekend.

References

External links
Vekh Baraatan Challiyan trailer

Punjabi-language Indian films
2010s Punjabi-language films
Films scored by Jatinder Shah
Haryanvi-language films